Herbert Hutchinson Brimley (7 March 1861 – 4 April 1946) was a self-trained zoologist and long-time director of the North Carolina Museum of Natural Sciences. His brother, C.S. Brimley, was also a zoologist who worked at the same museum. Both Brimley brothers are buried at Historic Oakwood Cemetery in Raleigh.

Notes

References and external links
Collecting Nature: The Beginning of the North Carolina Museum of Natural Sciences—accessed 19 June 2008
North Carolina State Archives Photo Gallery--Herbert Hutchinson Brimley—accessed 19 June 2008
University of Iowa, Museum of Natural History--A Whale for Iowa—accessed 19 June 2008
Historic Oakwood Cemetery—grave listings, accessed 27 June 2008
Journal of the North Carolina Academy of Sciences Collection—accessed 19 June 2008
Herbert Hutchinson Brimley, 1949. A North Carolina Naturalist: H.H. Brimley: Selections from His Writings. Chapel Hill, North Carolina: University of North Carolina Press, 205 pp.

1861 births
1946 deaths
Burials at Historic Oakwood Cemetery
Brimley family
People from Bedfordshire
Directors of museums in the United States
British emigrants to the United States
19th-century American zoologists
20th-century American zoologists
19th-century British zoologists
20th-century British zoologists